John Hugh Catherwood (August 7, 1888 – November 18, 1930) was a United States Navy Ordinary Seaman received the Medal of Honor for actions during the Moro Rebellion aboard  Seaman Catherwood was critically wounded during the action on September 24, 1911, for which he and six other men were awarded their medals.  Catherwood died of a self-inflicted gunshot wound on November 18, 1930. Seaman Catherwood is buried in the Camp Butler National Cemetery.

Medal of Honor citation
Rank and organization: Ordinary Seaman, U.S. Navy. Born: August 7, 1888, Springfield, Ill. Accredited to: Illinois. G.O. No.: 138, December 13, 1911.

Citation:

While attached to the U.S.S. Pampang, Catherwood was one of a shore party moving in to capture Mundang, on the island of Basilan, Philippine Islands, on the morning of 24 September 1911. Advancing with the scout party to reconnoiter a group of nipa huts close to the trail, Catherwood unhesitatingly entered the open area before the huts, where his party was suddenly taken under point-blank fire and charged by approximately 20 enemy Moros coming out from inside the native huts and from other concealed positions. Struck down almost instantly by the outlaws' deadly fire, Catherwood, although unable to rise, rallied to the defense of his leader and fought desperately to beat off the hostile attack. By his valiant effort under fire and in the face of great odds, Catherwood contributed materially toward the destruction and rout of the enemy.

See also

List of Medal of Honor recipients
List of Philippine–American War Medal of Honor recipients

Notes

References

United States Navy Medal of Honor recipients
1888 births
1930 deaths
American military personnel of the Philippine–American War
Philippine–American War recipients of the Medal of Honor
Suicides by firearm in Illinois